Jamal Robinson (born January 13, 1993) is a former American football wide receiver. He previously played for the Hamilton Tiger-Cats of the Canadian Football League (CFL) and played college football at Louisiana-Lafayette.

Early years
Robinson attended Salmen High School in Slidell, Louisiana, where he earned all-state honors as a senior. That year, he caught 84 passes for 1,021 yards and 19 touchdowns. He was rated three-star prospect by Rivals.com. In his junior year, he made 48 catches for 623 yards and eight touchdowns.

He was a two-sport athlete, playing basketball, as well. His junior season, the basketball team won the state title. His senior year, they went 26 and 7, and advanced to the state quarterfinals.

Professional career
Robinson was signed by the Jacksonville Jaguars as an undrafted free agent on May 1, 2016. He was waived by the Jaguars on August 29 and was later added to the practice squad on September 7. He signed a reserve/future contract with the Jaguars on January 9, 2017.

On September 1, 2017, Robinson was waived by the Jaguars.

On October 3, 2017, Robinson was signed to the Hamilton Tiger-Cats' practice roster. He was traded from the Tiger-Cats to the Alouettes on June 10, 2018.

In 2018, Robinson signed with the Birmingham Iron of the Alliance of American Football. He was waived before the start of the 2019 regular season, but was re-signed on February 22, 2019. The league ceased operations in April 2019.

Personal life
He was born on January 13, 1993, in New Orleans, Louisiana to Tashawn Mitchell and Joy Robinson. He has one brother, Jalil, and three sisters Jazmon, Jeuel and Jaliyah. He majored in criminal justice.
He's married to Derione Green Robinson and has two kids together as well, Autymn and Jamal Jr Robinson.

References

External links
Louisiana–Lafayette Ragin' Cajuns bio

1993 births
Living people
People from Slidell, Louisiana
Players of American football from New Orleans
Players of Canadian football from New Orleans
American football wide receivers
Canadian football wide receivers
American players of Canadian football
University of Louisiana at Lafayette alumni
Louisiana Ragin' Cajuns football players
Jacksonville Jaguars players
Hamilton Tiger-Cats players
Birmingham Iron players